Glenn Allen Blackwood (born February 23, 1957) is a former professional football player, He played safety for nine seasons in the National Football League (NFL).

Biography
Blackwood was born in San Antonio, Texas and graduated from Churchill High School. He attended the University of Texas. His brother Lyle Blackwood also played in the NFL, and they were teammates from 1981 through 1986 with the Miami Dolphins. On a Monday night game against Buffalo in 1981, Glenn at strong safety and Lyle at free safety ganged up to put some heavy hits on the Bills’ players, prompting a Miami sportswriter to dub them "The Bruise Brothers." The moniker stuck. Blackwood finished his career with 29 interceptions and 13 fumble recoveries. His four fumble recoveries in 1980 led the NFL.

Personal life
Blackwood owns a home in Wellington, Florida. His son Glenn Jacob "Jake" Blackwood played football at Georgia Tech. Blackwood coached his son in high school, serving as head football coach of The King's Academy in West Palm Beach, Florida, in 2001 and 2002 and as an assistant football coach from 2003 to 2006.

References

External links 
 TheGoal.com; Glenn Blackwood

1957 births
Living people
American football safeties
Texas Longhorns football players
Miami Dolphins players
Players of American football from San Antonio
People from Wellington, Florida
Ed Block Courage Award recipients